Nosaby Church (Swedish: Nosaby kyrka) is located in the village Nosaby in Kristianstad Municipality, Sweden.

History
Before the present church was built, there was a stone church from the 12th century. The former church was too small and they wanted to build a new church. They discussed about a new church since the mid of the 12th century and first in 1871 they started build a new brick church in Gothic Revival style according to drawings by Helgo Zettervall (1831–1907)  and it opened at Pentecost of 1875.

References and sources

External links
Nosaby kyrka  svenskakyrkan 

19th-century Church of Sweden church buildings
Churches completed in 1875
Churches in Skåne County
Churches in the Diocese of Lund
Kristianstad Municipality
Gothic Revival church buildings in Sweden